Mark Althavan Andrews (born November 9, 1978), known professionally as Sisqó (stylized as SisQó), is an American singer, songwriter, record producer, dancer and actor. He is most prominently known for his singles "Thong Song", "Incomplete" and his membership in R&B group "Dru Hill." Sisqo's successful debut solo album, Unleash the Dragon (1999), included the hit singles "Thong Song" and "Incomplete".

Early life
As a teen Andrews worked at The Fudgery in Harborplace at Baltimore's Inner Harbor with Larry "Jazz" Anthony, James "Woody" Green, and Tamir "Nokio" Ruffin. The quartet would be signed as the group Dru Hill to Island Records in 1996. He lived in the Reservoir Hill neighborhood at 908 Newington Avenue near Druid Hill Park which is where the group got their name.

Andrews graduated from Mergenthaler Vocational-Technical High School in 1994. Sisqó's visual trademarks are his hairstyles and flamboyant stage costumes, which were regularly flashier than those of his groupmates. Over his career as a recording artist, both with and without Dru Hill, Sisqó's hairstyles have included a bleached blond Caesar, a platinum Caesar (colored with silver spray paint), blond cornrows, a neon-red dyed Caesar, and a blond Mohawk.

Career
After Woody departed Dru Hill in 1999 to pursue a solo career, it was decided that the other members would follow suit and issue their own solo albums. Sisqó's solo debut, Unleash the Dragon, was released on Def Soul Records in November 1999. Unleash the Dragon sold moderately at first, until the February 2000 release of its second single, the novelty "Thong Song". A runaway hit, "Thong Song" and its follow-up, "Incomplete", were major hits on the Billboard Hot 100 chart, with "Thong Song" making it to number three, and "Incomplete" going to #1. This success resulted in Play Along Toys manufacturing a Sisqó a Celebrity doll in 2001.

Formed by Sisqó in 1999, LovHer was the first female quartet on the Def Soul label. Their single "How It's Gonna Be" was featured on the Rush Hour 2 soundtrack in 2001.

Conflicts within Dru Hill prevented the group from reuniting as planned in 2000. This is usually attributed to time conflicts during the recording of Sisqó's second solo LP. During this period, Sisqó branched out into hosting the dance competition program Sisqós Shakedown on MTV, and into film, taking on supporting roles in the films Get Over It (2001) with Kirsten Dunst and Snow Dogs (2002) with Cuba Gooding, Jr. He also starred as a vampire in Sabrina the Teenage Witch (Season 6 Episode 1). Although his second LP, Return of Dragon, released in June 2001, eventually went platinum, its singles "Can I Live" and "Dance for Me" performed far below expectations (apart from in the United Kingdom, where "Dance for Me" became his third top ten hit). By 2002, Sisqó reunited with Dru Hill, which released its third LP in late 2002. The LP underperformed, and the group was subsequently released from their recording contract.

In January 2008, Sisqó was a contestant on a reality show called "Gone Country."

In 2010, Sisqó was a contestant on the British reality television show Celebrity Big Brother 7, which he placed 8th. He was the fifth contestant to be evicted, lasting 20 days.

Dru Hill released its third album, InDRUpendence Day, in 2010 as an independent release through Kedar Entertainment. The group also appeared at this time in the reality show Keith Sweat's Platinum House on BET's sister station Centric.

Sisqó continued to tour through the 2010s, both as a member of Dru Hill, and as a solo act. His third solo album, Last Dragon, was released on February 10, 2015. The singles, "A-List" and "L.I.P.s" were released ahead of the album, with the latter reaching number 23 on the US Adult R&B charts, becoming Sisqó's first charting US single since 2001's "Can I Live".

, Sisqó, along with the other members of Dru Hill, claimed that their record label botched a record deal, costing them millions in the process.

In 2016, Sisqó provided a rap counterpoint in a duet with country music singer Marie Osmond, in her song "Give me a Good Song", which was featured on Music Is Medicine, released on April 15, 2016.

In 2017, Sisqó, sang on a remake of his "Thong Song" produced by JCY.

In 2018, Sisqo released a holiday book for children, titled "Sisqo's Perfect Christmas", with creative partner, Tilesha Brown.

He represents Maryland in the American Song Contest, which began on March 21, 2022 on NBC.

Personal life
Sisqó has a daughter, Shaione Andrews, born in 1995. He resides in Maple Grove, Minnesota with his wife Elizabeth Pham, who he has been romantically involved with since 2003. 
In July 2013, Sisqó appeared on the reality show Celebrity Wife Swap, where Elizabeth was "swapped" with the wife of 1990s pop singer Gerardo Mejía.

He previously dated R&B singer Samantha Mumba from 2004 to 2005.

Discography

with Dru Hill
 Dru Hill (1996)
 Enter the Dru (1998)
 Dru World Order (2002)
 InDRUpendence Day (2010)

Solo albums
 Unleash the Dragon (1999)
 Return of Dragon (2001)
 Last Dragon (2015)
 Platinum Thrones (2023)

Mixtape albums
 Dragon Music (2008)
 The Return of the Dragon (2010)

Compilation albums
 20th Century Masters – The Millennium Collection: The Best of Sisqó (2006)

Extended plays
 Thong Song – Best Of – EP (2013)
 Genesis (2019)

Unreleased albums
 The Last Dragon  (2008/2012)

Filmography

Commercials

Tours
As supporting act
 No Strings Attached Tour (supporting NSYNC) 
 Black & Blue World Tour (supporting Backstreet Boys) 
Featured act
 Roc Tha Block 
 Hammer's House Party Tour 
 RNB Fridays Live

Awards and nominations
 American Music Awards

|-
| style="text-align:center;" rowspan=2| 2001
|| Sisqó
| Favorite Male R&B/Soul Artist
| 
|-
|| Unleash the Dragon
| Favorite R&B/Soul Album
| 
|-

 Billboard Music Awards

|-
| style="text-align:center;" rowspan=6| 2000
|rowspan=6| Sisqó
| Male Artist of the Year
| 
|-
| Male Hot 100 Singles Artist of the Year
| 
|-
| R&B/Hip-Hop Artist of the Year
| 
|-
| New R&B/Hip-Hop Artist of the Year
| 
|-
| R&B/Hip-Hop Male Artist of the Year
| 
|-
| R&B/Hip-Hop Singles Artist of the Year
| 
|-

 Grammy Awards

|-
| style="text-align:center;" rowspan=4| 2001
|| Sisqó
| Best New Artist
| 
|-
|rowspan=2| Thong Song
| Best R&B Male Vocal Performance
| 
|-
| Best R&B Song
| 
|-
|| Unleash the Dragon
| Best R&B Album
| 
|-

 MOBO Awards

|-
| style="text-align:center;"| 2001
|| Sisqó
| Best R&B Act
| 
|-
| style="text-align:center;" rowspan=2| 2000
|| Thong Song
| Best Video
| 
|-
|| Sisqó
| Best R&B Act
| 
|-

 MTV Europe Music Awards

|-
| style="text-align:center;" rowspan=2| 2000
|rowspan=3| Sisqó
| Best Male
| 
|-
| Best R&B
| 
|-

 MTV Video Music Awards

|-
| style="text-align:center;" rowspan=5| 2000
|rowspan=3| Thong Song
| Best Hip-Hop Video
| 
|-
| Best New Artist
| 
|-
| Best Dance Video
| 
|-
|| Thong Song (Remix) w/ Foxy Brown
| Best Video from a Film
| 
|-
|| Thong Song
| Viewer's Choice
| 
|-

 Soul Train Music Awards

|-
| style="text-align:center;"| 2001
|rowspan=3| Unleash the Dragon
| Favorite Male R&B/Soul Album
| 
|-

 Teen Choice Awards

|-
| style="text-align:center;" rowspan=4| 2000
|| Sisqó
| Choice Male Artist
| 
|-
|| Thong Song
| Choice R&B/Hip-Hop Track
| 
|-
|| Sisqó
| Choice Breakout Artist
| 
|-
|| Incomplete
| Choice Song of the Summer
| 
|-

Books

References

External links
 
 

1978 births
Living people
21st-century American male actors
African-American male dancers
African-American dancers
American male dancers
American male film actors
20th-century African-American male singers
African-American male actors
African-American television personalities
American contemporary R&B singers
Def Jam Recordings artists
Musicians from Baltimore
Participants in American reality television series
World Music Awards winners
Male actors from Baltimore
American hip hop singers
American male television actors
21st-century American singers
21st-century American male singers
21st-century African-American male singers
American Song Contest contestants